Mads Dahm (born 21 October 1988), is a Norwegian footballer playing for Lyn in the Norwegian Third Division. He has played two games for Norway national under-21 football team. He is the younger brother of former Lyn player Fredrik Dahm. In August 2010, he signed for Lillestrøm, following Lyn's bankruptcy. In February, he decided to go back and help his old club Lyn back to the top.

Career statistics

References

Norwegian footballers
Lyn Fotball players
1988 births
Living people
Lillestrøm SK players

Association football defenders
Eliteserien players
Norwegian First Division players
Norwegian Second Division players
Norwegian Third Division players
Norwegian Fourth Division players
Footballers from Oslo